Charierges is a genus of moths of the family Noctuidae. The genus was erected by Max Wilhelm Karl Draudt in 1950. Both species are found in Yunnan, China.

Species
Charierges nigralba Draudt, 1950
Charierges brunneomedia Draudt, 1950

References

Cuculliinae